KBFI (1450 AM, "Talk Radio 1450") is a radio station broadcasting a News Talk Information format. Located in Bonners Ferry, Idaho, the station is currently owned by Radio Bonners Ferry, Inc. (Blue Sky Broadcasting, Inc.)

While licensed to Bonner's Ferry and its transmitter site is there, KBFI shares studios and offices with its sister stations at 327 Marion Avenue in Sandpoint, Idaho.

References

External links

FCC History Cards for KBFI

BFI
News and talk radio stations in the United States
1984 establishments in Idaho
Radio stations established in 1984